The 2022 Atlantic Coast Conference women's soccer season was the 34th season of women's varsity soccer in the conference.

Virginia were the defending regular season champions. Florida State were the defending ACC Tournament champions.  The Seminoles are also the defending national champions.

North Carolina and Florida State were co-regular season champions with 8–2–0 records.  Florida State won the ACC Tournament over North Carolina, by a score of 2–1 in the final.

The ACC had ten teams selected to the NCAA tournament, which was the most of any conference. The conference finished with a 20–9–1 overall record in the tournament, with Florida State and North Carolina making it to the Semifinals.

Teams

Stadiums and locations 

1.  Georgia Tech does not sponsor women's soccer

Coaches

Coaching Changes

Pre-Season

 Mark Krikorian resigned as head coach of Florida State on March 29, 2022. Brian Pensky was hired as his replacement on April 25, 2022.

Head Coaching Records

Notes
Records shown are prior to the 2022 season
Years at school includes the 2022 season

Pre-season

Hermann Trophy Watchlist 

The Hermann Trophy preseason watchlist was released on August 18, 2022.  The ACC had eight players named to the sixty player watchlist.

Pre-season poll

Pre-season Coaches Poll 

Source:

Pre-season All-ACC Team

Source:

Regular season

Conference Matrix

The table below shows head-to-head results between teams in conference play. Each team plays ten matches.  Each team does not play every other team.

Rankings

United Soccer

Top Drawer Soccer

Players of the Week

Postseason

ACC Tournament

NCAA Tournament 

The Atlantic Coast Conference had ten teams selected to the NCAA Tournament, which was the most of any conference.  Their two number one seeds was also the most of any conference.  Eight of the ten selected teams were seeded, which gained those teams the right to host a first round match.

Awards and honors

ACC Awards

2023 NWSL Draft

The ACC had twelve players selected in the 2023 NWSL Draft.  Seven of the twelve players were selected in the First Round, which was more than half of all First Round picks.  Those seven and the twelve overall were the highest by any conference.  This was the third straight year where an ACC player was selected as one of the top-five picks.

References 

 
2022 NCAA Division I women's soccer season